Manito may refer to:

Places
 Manito, Albay, Philippines
 Manito, Illinois, United States
 Manito/Cannon Hill, Spokane, Washington, United States

People
Jesús Alejandro Pérez, who is also known as "Manito".
João Manito Lopes*, who is a known Portuguese person named "Manito".

See also

 Manito Park and Botanical Gardens
 Manito Township
 Manito (film) 
 Manitou
 Manitou (disambiguation)